The American Society of Golf Course Architects (abbreviated as ASGCA) is a professional organization of golf course designers in America. Founded in 1946, its members are actively involved in the design of new courses and the renovation of existing courses in the United States and Canada.  One of its founders was noted golf course architect Robert White.  The abbreviation is typically referenced at the end of a person's name when documenting or discussing golf course architecture.

About ASGCA
Founded in 1946, the American Society of Golf Course Architects (ASGCA) is the oldest professional organization of golf course designers in America.

All ASGCA members have completed of a minimum of five major golf course projects and are peer-reviewed by the ASGCA membership.

Over the past several years ASGCA has published three editions of An Environmental Approach to Golf Course Development to help educate permitting boards, town councils, developers, media, and the general public about the positive role golf courses can play in preserving the environment. Released in 2008, the current, third edition highlights 18 case studies that showcase success stories dealing with a variety of sensitive habitats.

History
This excerpt from the 1947 ASGCA minutes confirms ASGCA and the golf industry have faced some of the same issues for decades. In the following, Mr. Richard Tufts of Pinehurst addresses the 10 assembled charter members regarding the work of the "Implements and Balls Committee" of the USGA:

"This problem primarily concerns the flight of the golf ball, of course, which is why I thought you as golf course architects would be interested in it essentially. It is something the USGA has been working on for a good many years. Mr. Fownes, who is president here (Pinehurst), was very active as chairman of this committee when he held that position prior to his service as President of the USGA, and he did a great deal of work on this whole problem of the golf ball. I've been very much interested in it since I've been Chairman of the committee. We feel that a golf course is designed for a certain type of shot to the green, and that as you increase the length of the tee shot, you throw the golf course all out of scale. Therefore, it spoils the pleasure of the play to have this continual increase in the flight of the ball. We feel that the question involves not only the ball but also the equipment of the game; that possibly the shaft had something to do with the increased length of the ball. We've done a lot of work in Chicago with our machine there in testing the ball. Since our tests first started back in 1942 we haven't observed much increase in the flight of the ball, it's been pretty constant. The manufacturers say pretty much the same thing: that they haven't changed the ball very much, and in their opinions it hasn't increased.

"However, that doesn't mean that it might not increase in the future. It's quite possible that improvements to the present ball have just about reached 100 percent efficiency under the present method of manufacture, but it's quite possible that there might be improvements in plastics, or other material, that would greatly increase the flight of the present ball. We feel that it would be a very serious thing for the game, and we'd like the support of your association in maintaining the present ball; helping us with this...

"At the conclusion of Mr. Tuft's speech, Mr. Thompson made a motion that the Society send a resolution to the USGA to the effect that as a body the members pledge their support to the rules and regulations adopted by the USGA, and that the Society recognizes the USGA as the ruling body of golf in the United States. Mr. Bell seconded the motion and it passed unanimously...

"The Society then appointed a committee of two to work on this resolution: Mr. Donald J. Ross and Mr. Robert Trent Jones. Mr. Jones was appointed delegate to the USGA's annual meeting."

Membership
Membership in ASGCA signifies that an architect is a qualified profession golf course architect. Every ASGCA member must complete a two-year application process and prove that they have acquired sound technical training, have no less than eight years of practical experience in golf course architecture, have designed at least five 18-hole golf course equivalents and is recognized by other ASGCA members as a competent professional golf course architect.

Peer Review
ASGCA members are very involved in the review of each potential member's application. Four of the five representative courses submitted on an application are evaluated in person by an ASGCA member. The member studies plans of the course, interviews construction personnel, club management and either walks or plays the course with the applicant.

Each applicant must also be sponsored by three ASGCA members. The sponsors are members who can personally vouch for the character, professional integrity and high level of applied architecture skill of the applicant.

Code of Ethics
In addition, ASGCA members abide by standards of professional practice and a stringent code of ethics. The code of ethics set standards for the golf course architect's role in contract negotiations and their responsibilities to the client. Many public agencies and entities have recognized that the ASGCA membership constitutes the highest professional standards in golf course design.

Description of Membership
A member of the American Society of Golf Course Architects is one who by virtue of their knowledge of the game, training, experience, vision and inherent ability, is in all ways qualified to design and prepare specifications for a course of functional and aesthetic perfection. They are further qualified to execute and oversee the implementation on the ground of his plans and specifications to create an enjoyable layout that challenges golfers of all abilities and exemplifies the highest standards and traditions of golf. They will counsel in all phases of the work to protect the best interest of their client.

Each member of the American Society of Golf Course Architects is engaged primarily in golf course architecture, and their qualifications have satisfied the Board of Governors in all respects.

Past and Present Presidents

Donald Ross Award Winners
The Donald Ross Award, ASGCA's highest honor, is presented annually to an individual who has made significant and lasting contributions to the profession of golf course architecture.

See also
:Category:Golf clubs and courses by designer
Landscape design
Landscape architecture

References

External links
ASGCA Find a Member Find a specific ASGCA member (listed alphabetically and by location)
ASGCA Architect's Gallery Features ASGCA members and their work
ASGCA Official Site

Sports professional associations based in the United States
Golf in the United States